Hymenoxys rusbyi is a North American species of flowering plant in the daisy family known by the common names Rusby's rubberweed or Rusby's bitterweed. It has been found only in the states of Arizona and New Mexico in the southwestern United States.

Hymenoxys rusbyi grows in open areas, generally at the edges of pine-oak forests at elevations of 1500–2500 meters (5000–8300 feet). It is a perennial herb up to 150 cm (5 feet) tall. One plant can produce sometimes as many as 250 flower heads in a branching, flat-topped array. Each head has 6–8 yellow ray flowers and 25–50 tiny yellow disc flowers.

References

External links
Photo of herbarium specimen at Missouri Botanical Garden, collected in New Mexico in 1881

rusbyi
Flora of Arizona
Flora of New Mexico
Plants described in 1883